Abraham Beach ( – ) was an American Episcopalian clergyman. 

He graduated from Yale College in 1757 with the honors of the valedictory, became a convert to the Episcopal faith, and studied theology under Dr. Samuel Johnson and his relative, John Beach. In 1767 he went to England, and there received ordination to the priesthood. He was appointed missionary to New Brunswick, and entered upon his work in September, 1767. During the American Revolutionary War his position between the two armies was exceedingly embarrassing. In consequence his church was closed, and he did not officiate until December, 1781, when, in accordance with the suggestions of the Archbishop of Canterbury, it became permissible to conduct public worship with the omission of the prayers for the king and parliament. In 1784 he became the assistant minister of Trinity Church in New York, and continued an active worker in the diocese of New York until 1813. He was on many occasions a delegate to the General Convention of the Episcopal Church, and in 1801, 1804, and 1810 was president of the house of lay and clerical delegates. Of Rutgers College, established in 1770 at New Brunswick, he was an early trustee. In 1786 he was elected a regent of the University of the State of New York, and in 1787 a trustee of Columbia College, from which institution he received the honorary degree of D. D. in 1789. He was likewise actively associated with many of the benevolent institutions of New York. Subsequent to his resignation from Trinity parish he retired to his farm on Raritan River, near New Brunswick, where he resided until his death. His only publications were sermons.

Abraham Beach died on 14 September 1828 near New Brunswick, New Jersey.

References

Created via preloaddraft
18th-century American Episcopal priests
1828 deaths
People from Cheshire, Connecticut
Yale College alumni
19th-century American Episcopal priests